Grant is the name of some places in the U.S. state of Wisconsin:
Grant County, Wisconsin
Grant, Clark County, Wisconsin, a town
Grant, Dunn County, Wisconsin, a town
Grant, Monroe County, Wisconsin, a town
Grant, Portage County, Wisconsin, a town
Grant, Rusk County, Wisconsin, a town
Grant, Shawano County, Wisconsin, a town